Padmaraj Ratheesh is an Indian actor who appears in Malayalam films.

The son of film actor Ratheesh, Padmaraj made his debut with Deepu Karunakaran's Fireman (2015) in which he played a negative role. Then he starred in G. Marthandan's directorial Acha Dhin.

Personal life 

Padmaraj was born to actor Ratheesh and Diana. He has an elder sister Parvathy, younger sister Padma and a younger brother Pranav. Padmaraj graduated with a Bachelor of Business Management degree and was working as a floor manager in a retail company at Coimbatore for a couple of years before he quit to look after his ailing mother. His elder sister Parvathy has also stepped into the film industry and acted as the lead heroine opposite Kunchacko Boban in director Sugeeth's movie Madhura Naranga.

Film career

Padmaraj made his debut with the Malayalam film Fireman (2015) in which he played a negative role opposite Mammootty. His second film is director G. Marthandan's Acha Dhin and the second time with Mammootty. He got a golden opportunity of starring with Mammootty, Mohanlal , Madhu, Biju Menon, Nivin Pauly, Sunny Wayne , Unni Mukundan and Manju Warrier within his first 10 films.

Filmography

References

Living people
Male actors from Thiruvananthapuram
Male actors in Malayalam cinema
Indian male film actors
1989 births
21st-century Indian male actors